Movie Lounge is a movie and DVD review television show, presented by newspaper columnist and food critic Giles Coren, broadcast in 2006. It was shown on the British terrestrial channel Five.

Movie Lounge was produced by Monkey Kingdom.

Celebrity guests
Movie Lounge had a number of famous guests during its airing on Channel Five. These include:

Sue Perkins
Gail Porter
Nicholas Hoult
Emma Kennedy
Kenny Baker

Regular features
Regular features included:
 A film being critiqued by art critic Brian Sewell, who, more often than not, savages said film. 
 A film being critiqued by "The Sleazy Kid", a lecherous 15-year-old boy who seems to be only interested in light nudity in a film.

References

External links
 

British non-fiction television series
Channel 5 (British TV channel) original programming
2006 British television series debuts
2006 British television series endings
English-language television shows